The Bahraini ambassador in Paris is the official representative of the Government in Manama to the Government of France. 
He has concurrent Diplomatic accreditation as Permanent Representative to the UNESCO and since 2008 to the Holy See.

List of representatives

References 

Journal officiel de la République française:

 
France
Bahrain